The second election to Pembrokeshire County Council was held on 8 March 1892.  It was preceded by the 1889 election and followed by the 1895 election.

Overview of the result

At the inaugural election in 1889 most seats were contested, but three years later many of the sitting members were returned unopposed.

Unopposed returns

In the vast majority of wards, candidates were returned unopposed. There were fewer contested elections than three years previously.

Boundary changes

Multi-member wards in Pembroke and Pembroke Dock were replaced by single member wards. Tenby continued as a two member ward.

Results

Ambleston

Amroth

Begelly

Burton

Camrose

Carew

Clydey

Castlemartin
Earl Cawdor, who was elected at the inaugural election, was replaced by another Conservative representative.

Eglwyswrw
The returning member gave his casting vote in favour of the sitting member, Thomas Williams.

Fishguard

Haverfordwest St Martin's Hamlets

Haverfordwest, Prendergast and Uzmaston

Haverfordwest, St Thomas and Furzy Park

Haverfordwest St Martin's and St Mary's

Kilgerran

Lampeter Velfrey

Llanfyrnach

Llanwnda

Llangwm

Llanstadwell

Llawhaden

Maenclochog

Manorbier

Mathry

Milford

Monkton

Nevern

Newport

Narberth North

Pembroke Ward 30

Pembroke Ward 31

Pembroke Dock Ward 32

Pembroke Dock Ward 33

Pembroke Dock Ward 34

Pembroke Dock Ward 35

Pembroke Dock Ward 36

St David's

St Dogmaels

St Ishmaels

St Issels

Slebech and Martletwy

Staynton

Tenby (two seats)

Walwyn's Castle

Whitchurch

Wiston

Election of aldermen
Mr G. P. Brewer (L.), N arberth, 46 votes; 
Mr Joseph Thomas (L.), Haverfordwest, 38; 
Mr Benjamin Rees (L.), Granant, 38; 
Mr H. Seymour Allen (L.), Crescelly, 28; 
Rev William Evans (L.), Pembroke Dock, 23 
Mr R. Thomas (L.). Trebover, 28; 
Mr William Watts Williams (L.), St. David's, 28; 
Mr William Mason (L.), Pem- broke Dock, 26.

References

1892
19th century in Pembrokeshire
Pembrokeshire